Achraf Ben Dhiaf (born 21 May 1995) is a Tunisian footballer who plays for Al-Nairyah as a midfielder.

References

External links
 
 

1995 births
Living people
Tunisian footballers
Tunisian expatriate footballers
Stade Tunisien players
CO Médenine players
ES Zarzis players
Wej SC players
Al-Nairyah Club players
US Tataouine players
Tunisian Ligue Professionnelle 1 players
Saudi Second Division players
Expatriate footballers in Saudi Arabia
Tunisian expatriate sportspeople in Saudi Arabia
Association football midfielders